Alicia Leigh Willis (born March 1, 1978) is an American actress. She is known for her roles in soap operas.

Personal life
Alicia was born in Atlanta, Georgia.  She is one of four children. Sisters Kimberly and Tiffany, and brother Ryan. Her father is actor David E. Willis and her mother is Leigh Willis.
Alicia currently resides in Aliso Viejo, California.

Career
She portrayed Alli Fowler on the NBC soap opera Another World from 1998 to 1999.  From December 2001 to February 2006, Willis played Courtney Matthews on the ABC soap opera, General Hospital.  She was nominated for two Daytime Emmy awards for her work on GH.

Willis also had a recurring role as Corey Conway on the WB Network series 7th Heaven. In October 2006, Willis guest starred on CSI: Miami. She starred as Elizabeth, the title role of the 2007 MyNetworkTV telenovela American Heiress.

Filmography

Film

Television

References

External links
 
 

1978 births
Living people
21st-century American actresses
20th-century American actresses
Actresses from Atlanta
American film actresses
American soap opera actresses
American television actresses
American telenovela actresses